Dialectica pavonicola is a moth of the family Gracillariidae. It is known from South Africa.

The larvae feed on Pavonia columella. They mine the leaves of their host plant. The mine has the form of a large, irregular, transparent, whitish blotch-mine on the upperside of the leaf with a greenish-brown discoloration.

References

Endemic moths of South Africa
Dialectica (moth)
Moths of Africa
Moths described in 1961